Arthur Antunes Coimbra (born 3 March 1953), better known as Zico, is a Brazilian football coach and former player who played as an attacking midfielder. Often called the "White Pelé", he was a creative playmaker, with excellent technical skills, vision and an eye for goal, who is considered one of the most clinical finishers and best passers ever, as well as one of the greatest players of all time. He is also widely regarded as the greatest Brazilian to never win the World Cup. One of the world's best players of the late 1970s and early 1980s, he is regarded as one of the best playmakers and free kick specialists in history, able to bend the ball in all directions. As stated on goal.com, Zico is the player that scored the most goals from direct free kicks, with 101 goals.

In 1999, Zico came eighth in the FIFA Player of the Century grand jury vote, and in 2004 was named in the FIFA 100 list of the world's greatest living players. As stated by Pelé himself, considered one of the greatest players of all time, "throughout the years, the one player that came closest to me was Zico".

With 48 goals in 71 official appearances for Brazil, Zico is the fifth highest goalscorer for his national team. He represented Brazil in the 1978, 1982 and 1986 World Cups. They did not win any of those tournaments, even though the 1982 squad is considered one of the greatest Brazilian national squads ever. Zico is often considered one of the best players in football history not to have been a member of a World Cup winning squad. He was chosen as the 1981 and 1983 Player of the Year.

Zico has coached the Japanese national team, appearing in the 2006 FIFA World Cup and winning the 2004 Asian Cup, and Fenerbahçe, who were a quarter-finalist in 2007–08 in the Champions League under his command. He was announced as the head coach of CSKA Moscow in January 2009. In September 2009, Zico was signed by Greek side Olympiacos for a two-year contract after the club's previous coach, Temuri Ketsbaia, was dismissed. He was fired four months later, in January 2010. In August 2011, Zico was appointed as coach of Iraq to lead them in the 2014 FIFA World Cup qualification. He resigned on 29 November 2012.

Zico works as technical director at Kashima Antlers.

Early years 

Born in 1953, Zico came from a lower-middle-class family of Portuguese origin, in the neighbourhood of Quintino Bocaiúva, Rio de Janeiro. In common with many young Brazilians, he spent much of his youth dreaming of being a professional footballer and skipped school to play football on the streets. His passion for the sport made him famous in the neighbourhood, where people would gather to see the boy's brilliant performances against older children and teenagers. At that time he was playing for Juventude, a local futsal street team run by his older brothers and friends, and had also begun to play for futsal club River Futebol Clube on Sundays.

His nickname originated in Zico's own family from increasingly shortened versions of Arthurzinho ("Little Arthur") which then became Arthurzico, then Tuzico and, finally, Zico, a version created by his cousin Ermelinda "Linda" Rolim.

In 1967, at 14 years old, he had a scheduled trial at América, where his brothers Antunes and Edu were professional players. But on a Sunday, during a River match, Zico scored nine goals and caught the attention of radio reporter Celso Garcia, who asked Zico's father to take him to a trial at Flamengo instead. Being a Flamengo fan, Zico had his father's approval, and so began his path towards becoming one of the most admired players in the history of the sport.

Youth career 
Zico was not physically strong, and his story of determination and discipline began with a tough muscle and body development program conducted by physical education teacher José Roberto Francalacci. A combination of hard work and also a special diet sponsored by his team enabled Zico to develop a strong body and become an athlete; this later proved to be essential for his success.

During 1971 and 1972, he shifted from youth to professional team and back. Coach Fleitas Solich had confidence in Zico's abilities and promoted him, on the other hand the situation changed when the Paraguayan coach left and Zagallo took over. He believed Zico to be too young and sent him back to the youth team. Things only improved for Zico when Joubert, his first coach at the youth team, was appointed the new coach for the seniors and fully promoted him after 116 matches and 81 goals in the youth team.

Club career

Flamengo (1971–1983) 

While at Flamengo, Zico was a key player during the most glorious period of the team's history. Along with many other titles, in his first period at Flamengo he led the team to victory in the 1981 Copa Libertadores, the 1981 Intercontinental Cup and four national titles (1980, 1982, 1983 and 1987). On the field, Zico made goals in all imaginable ways, was also a great assister and team organiser and was known for his excellent vision of the field. He was a two-footed player and an expert at free kicks.

Udinese (1983–1985) 
After receiving offers from A.S. Roma and A.C. Milan, moving to Italy seemed right and a four-million dollar proposal from Udinese was on the table. Such an amount of money made bigger clubs pressure the FIGC (Italian Football Federation) that blocked the transfer expecting financial guarantees. This caused a commotion in Udine as enraged Friulians flocked to the streets in protest against the Italian federation and the federal government. Historical reasons would make them shout "O Zico, o Austria!" ("Either Zico or Austria"). At the end of the controversy, the deal went through and though leaving Flamengo fans in sadness, Zico made the Friulians fans finally dream of better days.

In the 1983–84 Serie A, his first in Italy, his partnership with Franco Causio promised to take Udinese to a higher level, gaining respect from giants Juventus and Roma. His free kicks caused such an impact that TV sports programs would debate how to stop them. Despite his excellent performance, the club's season ended in disappointment as Udinese, in spite of scoring almost twice as many goals as the previous year, only gathered 32 points and was ninth in the final standing, losing three places in comparison to 1982–83. Zico scored 19 goals, one fewer than top scorer Michel Platini, having played 4 fewer matches than the French footballer due to an injury. Plus, he was voted 1983 Player of the Year by World Soccer Magazine.

His following season would be punctuated by injuries and suspensions for openly attacking referees. He also used to complain about the board's lack of ambition for not signing competitive players, which made the team too dependent on him. Furthermore, Italian tax officials pressed charges against him for tax evasion. Pressured, Zico delivered an amazing display against Diego Maradona's Napoli, his last match as a bianconero, and returned to Brazil and Flamengo, sponsored by a group of companies.

He became a fan favorite with his spectacular goals and is still adored now by all Udinese fans.

Back to Flamengo (1985–1989) 
Only one month after returning, he suffered a severe knee injury after a violent tackle from Bangu's defender Marcio Nunes, which interrupted his career for several months, even affecting his form in the 1986 FIFA World Cup. Recovered from injuries, things improved for Zico in 1987 when he led Flamengo to the Copa União title.

December 1989 marks Zico's last official appearance for Flamengo in a Brazilian National Championship match against rivals Fluminense. Zico scored the first goal and Flamengo won the match 5–0.

Two months later, at Maracanã, he would play his last match ever as a Flamengo player facing a World Cup Masters team composed of names like Eric Gerets, Claudio Gentile, Franco Causio, Alberto Tarantini, Jorge Valdano, Mario Kempes, Paul Breitner, Karl-Heinz Rummenigge and Falcão.
With 731 matches for Flamengo, Zico is the player with the 2nd most appearances for the club. His 508 goals make him the club's top scorer ever.

The achievements of the greatest idol in Flamengo's history inspired the Brazilian singer Jorge Ben Jor to write a song in his honour –  Camisa 10 da Gávea  – helping create the mystique of the club's number 10.

Brief retirement 
Zico represented Brazil in the World Cup of Masters, scoring in the final of the 1990 and 1991 editions.

After Brazil's first presidential election in many years, the new president Fernando Collor de Mello appointed Zico as his Minister of Sports. Zico stayed at this political assignment for about a year and his most important contribution was a piece of legislation dealing with the business side of sport teams.

Kashima Antlers (1991–1994) 
In 1991, Zico interrupted his political assignment when he accepted an offer to join the Sumitomo Metals in Kashima, Ibaraki Prefecture, at the time in the second tier, to help the club secure a place in Japan's first fully professional football league that was set to officially launch in 1993 – J1 League. Zico played for Sumitomo in 1991–92, the last season before the old Japan Soccer League was disbanded, and finished as the second division's top scorer. When the new league launched, In the opening match of the J.League he scored a hat-trick in a 5–0 win over Nagoya Grampus. The small town club, promoted and rebranded Kashima Antlers, was not expected to compete with richer, more glamorous clubs like Yokohama Marinos and Verdy Kawasaki. Zico, however, helped the Antlers to win the J.League Suntory Series and a runners-up finish in its inaugural season, leading the club to cement its place among the league's elite. On 15 June 1994, he scored the final goal in his career in a 2–1 win over Júbilo Iwata.

His discipline, talent and professionalism meshed very well with Japanese culture and his influence earned him the nickname  from Japanese football fans. He became a local legend in Japan for having built a contender from almost nothing and putting the city of Kashima on the map. A statue in his honor stands outside Kashima Soccer Stadium.

International career 
An episode related to Brazil national football team almost made Zico give up on his career. He made his international debut in the South American Qualifier to the 1972 Summer Olympics playing 5 matches and scoring the qualifying goal against Argentina. Despite this fact, he wasn't called up to the Munich games. He felt extremely frustrated and told his father in dismay he wanted to stop playing football. He was even absent from training at Flamengo for 10 days, being later convinced otherwise by his brothers.

In the opening group match of the 1978 World Cup against Sweden, Zico headed a corner kick into the goal in the final minute of the match, apparently breaking a 1–1 tie. However, in a call that became infamous, the Welsh referee Clive Thomas disallowed the goal, saying that he had blown the whistle to end the match while the ball was still in the air from a corner. In the second round, he scored from a penalty in a 3–0 win over Peru. Zico eventually won a bronze medal with Brazil at the tournament, defeating Italy in the 3rd place final. Zico also won another bronze medal with Brazil in the 1979 Copa América.

The 1982 World Cup would see Zico as part of a fantastic squad, side by side with Falcão, Sócrates, Éder, Cerezo and Júnior. In spite of his 4 goals and the great amount of skill in that squad (Zico was involved in eight consecutive goals scored by Brazil), the team was defeated 3–2 by Paolo Rossi and Italy in the final match of the second round group stage.

He played in the 1986 FIFA World Cup while still injured and only appeared as a second-half substitute throughout the tournament; in the quarter-final match against France during regulation time, he helped Brazil win a penalty, but then missed his kick. The match ended in a tie which led to a shootout. Zico then scored his goal, but penalties missed by Sócrates and Júlio César saw Brazil knocked out of the tournament.

Having been cleared of all the tax evasion charges by Italian officials in 1988, Zico decided to pay a tribute to Udine, the city that had madly welcomed him six years before, and played his farewell match for the Seleção in March 1989 losing 1–2 to a World All-Stars team at Stadio Friuli.

Style of play 
A classic number 10, Zico usually played as an attacking midfielder, although he was also capable of playing in several other attacking and midfield positions, and was also deployed as a central midfielder, as a second striker or inside forward, or even as an outside forward; he is regarded as one of the greatest footballers of all time. A diminutive playmaker, with a small, slender physique, although he was naturally right-footed, he was essentially a two-footed player, who was known for his flair, speed, exceptional technique, ball control and dribbling skills, as well as his use of tricks and feints to beat opponents with the ball. Former Dutch international Ruud Gullit rated Zico as "one of the best dribblers in the history of the game", describing him as "very nimble". Although he was not physically imposing, Zico was a quick, complete and highly creative player, with excellent vision, who is considered to be one of the best passers of all time and was known for his trademark no-look passes. In addition to being an elite creator of goalscoring opportunities, Zico was also a prolific goalscorer himself and an excellent finisher, due to his powerful and accurate striking ability, which made him extremely clinical in front of goal; as such he is also regarded by pundits as one of the greatest goalscorers in the history of the game.

He was also a set-piece specialist, who was renowned for his ability to bend the ball and score from dead ball situations and is considered to be one of the greatest free-kick takers of all time. Zico's unique free kick technique, which saw him place significant importance on his standing foot, often saw him lean back and raise his knee at a very high angle when hitting the ball with his instep, thus enabling him to lift it high over the wall, before it dropped back down again; his method of striking the ball allowed him to score free kicks even from close range, within 20 to 16 metres from the goal, or even from just outside the penalty area. Moreover, due to his technique, mentality, unpredictability and accuracy in dead ball situations, he was capable of placing the ball in either top or bottom corner on either side of the goal, which made it difficult for goalkeepers to read his free kicks. His ability from set-pieces inspired several other specialists, such as Roberto Baggio and Andrea Pirlo.

In addition to his footballing skills, Zico was also known for his leadership, mental strength and determination, as well as his stamina, dedication and for having an outstanding work-ethic; indeed, he was often known for staying behind in training to practice and refine his free kicks. Throughout his career, Zico was nicknamed O Galinho ("The Little Rooster", in Portuguese).

Despite his ability, his career was plagued by injuries.

Retirement 
Zico retired from professional football during the 1994 season but received an invitation to play beach soccer, winning the Beach Soccer World Cup 1995. Scoring 12 goals, he was the top scorer and was named the best player of the tournament. He returned to Kashima to become the Antlers' technical adviser in 1995, splitting his time between Japan and Brazil – where he still managed to find time to play beach soccer. One year later, in 1996, he won his second Beach Soccer World Cup with Brazil, scoring in the final against Uruguay. He founded CFZ (Zico Football Centre) in Rio de Janeiro. Zico founded another club, named CFZ de Brasília, in 1999.

Coaching career

Japan 
After the 2002 FIFA World Cup, Japan Football Association looked for a replacement for the outgoing Philippe Troussier, and chose Zico as his successor. Despite his lack of coaching experience besides his stint as Brazil's technical coordinator during the 1998 World Cup, Zico had great understanding of Japanese soccer from his playing days and his role as Kashima's technical director. In addition, JFA had grown tired of Troussier's clashes with the media while the players were frustrated with his micromanagement. In contrast, Zico commanded respect from reporters and urged players to express themselves on the pitch.

Although Zico attempted to instill a free-flowing, attacking mentality to the team, his regime got off to an uneven start, which included a 4–1 loss to Argentina in 2003. Japan had a respectable showing at that year's Confederations Cup but struggled again in the beginning of 2004, only narrowly beating Oman in the first stage of qualifying for the 2006 FIFA World Cup and several players were suspended after a drinking incident. Although Japan had not lost in its nine previous matches, he was rumored to be on the verge of resigning and a small group of fans marched in the streets of Tokyo demanding his firing.

He stayed on, however, and won the 2004 Asian Cup despite intimidation from Chinese fans and a team that featured just one European-based player, Shunsuke Nakamura. He then helped Japan qualify for the 2006 FIFA World Cup with just one loss.

Despite the rocky start, injuries to key players and even a bizarre offer from Garforth Town, Zico led Japan to its third World Cup finals appearance and the third Asian Cup title in four tries. His Japanese team was heavily influenced by Brazil's short passing style and he was flexible enough to switch between 4–4–2 and 3–5–2 formations. In addition, he has had a respectable record on European soil, beating Czech Republic and Greece and drawing with England, Brazil and Germany.

However, Japan failed to win a single match at the Finals, losing twice (to Australia and Brazil) and drawing once (to Croatia), and scoring just two goals while conceding seven. He resigned from Japan at the end of the World Cup campaign.

Fenerbahçe 
In July 2006, signed a two-year deal with Fenerbahçe. He won the league title in 2007 and won Turkish Super Cup on the first year of his job. Under his command Fenerbahçe has qualified from UEFA Champions League 2007–08 groups stage for the first time of club's history and beat Sevilla FC to become a quarter-finalist in 2007–08 season. So far, he also is the team's most successful manager in the history of the European arena.

Zico was given a new nickname by Fenerbahçe fans: Kral Arthur (meaning "King Arthur" in Turkish). For the team's nickname King Arthur and his Knights. In a chat hosted by uefa.com he pointed out that it is unlikely he will sign a contract extension with Fenerbahçe. This was confirmed on 10 June 2008 when he resigned as Fenerbahçe manager.

On 8 September 2008, Zico revealed that he would be interested taking over the vacant managers position at Newcastle United following the resignation of Kevin Keegan. He is quoted saying "The Newcastle job is one that I would be very interested in taking. It would be a privilege and an honour, I've always wanted to experience the Premier League as I believe I could enjoy much success coaching in England." He also commented that he isn't bothered about the structure of the board at Newcastle United, "I am used to working alongside technical directors so this isn't an issue for me. It's normal for me to work in those conditions."

Bunyodkor, CSKA Moscow and Olympiakos 

In 2008, he coached FC Bunyodkor in Uzbekistan, where he won the Uzbekistani Cup and the Uzbek League. He subsequently took over at Russian side CSKA Moscow but was fired on 10 September 2009.

Less than a week later Zico signed a 2-year contract with Olympiacos F.C. Despite the absence of numerous first-team players due to injuries, he led the Greek club to a comfortable 2nd place in Group H of the Champions League, earning the qualification to the knockout stage. In the Greek Superleague his first results were also impressive, but the success lasted only till early winter and the fans started to complain about both the results and the playing style of the team. On 19 January 2010, after a negative series of 4 matches with just one win, though his team lost only two times (twelve wins and four draws) in the Greek Superleague, Zico was sacked.

Iraq 
He signed a contract with Iraq Football Federation on 28 August 2011 and first managed the national team in a match against Jordan on 2 September 2011. Zico resigned as coach of the Iraqi national team on 27 November 2012 after little more than a year in the post, saying the country's football association had failed to fulfill the terms of his contract. He had 10 wins and six draws in 21 games with Iraq.

Al-Gharafa 
On 6 August 2013, he signed a two-year deal to coach, Al-Gharafa.

FC Goa 
Indian Super League side FC Goa signed Zico as their coach for the debut season in 2014. Though Goa had a slow start to the season, they ultimately qualified for the semifinals with a game in hand by defeating Chennaiyin FC. In 2015 FC Goa did really well to reach the final. Eventually Goa lost 3–2 to Chennaiyin FC. Zico has been regarded as Goa's new legend among the local fan base. In January 2017, FC Goa confirmed ending their three-year association with Zico. Keeping the logistical challenges of the upcoming season in mind, the two parties amicably came to this decision.

Administrative roles 
Zico was a director at Kashima Antlers between 1996 and 2002.

On 30 May 2010, it was announced that Zico would become the new Flamengo's football director on a four-year deal, coming back to the team where he won his most important honors after 25 years. This comeback, however, lasted only five months as he resigned due to disagreements with the board.

On 10 June 2015, Zico officially announced he would run for the FIFA presidency role after the recent announcement of Sepp Blatter's resignation following the alleged corruption surrounding the winning bids from Russia and Qatar to host the 2018 and 2022 tournaments.

In August 2018, Zico returned to Kashima Antlers as technical director, 16 years after his previous spell as a director at the club.

Personal life 
Zico is the grandson of Fernando Antunes Coimbra (paternal grandfather) and Arthur Ferreira da Costa Silva (maternal grandfather), both Portuguese. His father, José Antunes Coimbra, also Portuguese (b. Tondela, 1901; d. Rio de Janeiro, 1986), came to Brazil at age of 10. Zico's mother, Matilde Ferreira da Silva Costa, was born in 1919.

Zico was the youngest of six children—Maria José (Zezé), Antunes, Nando, Edu and Antônio (Tonico).

In 1969 Zico met his future wife, Sandra Carvalho de Sá. In 1970 the couple became engaged and married in 1975. Sandra's sister, Sueli, is Edu's wife. Zico has three sons, Arthur Jr., Bruno and Thiago. Zico is also a member of the legendary squad Classic Eleven from the FIFA video games series. Zico is Roman Catholic.

Career statistics

Player

Club 
This information is based on Zico's senior career totals.

1Include Copa do Brasil, Coppa Italia, JSL Cup, J.League Cup, and Emperor's Cup
2Include Copa Libertadores and Supercopa Sudamericana
3Campeonato Carioca extra tournament
4Include Intercontinental Cup

International

Managerial statistics

Honours

Player

Club 
Flamengo
 Campeonato Carioca: 1972, 1974, 1978, 1979, 1979 (extra), 1981, 1986
 Campeonato Brasileiro Série A: 1980, 1982, 1983
 Copa União: 1987
 Copa Libertadores: 1981
 Intercontinental Cup: 1981

Kashima Antlers
 J.League Suntory Series: 1993

International 
Brazil
 FIFA World Cup Third place: 1978
 Copa América Third place: 1979

Brazil U23
 CONMEBOL Pre-Olympic Tournament: 1971

Individual 
 Bola de Ouro: 1974, 1982
 Bola de Prata: 1974, 1975, 1977, 1982, 1987
 Campeonato Carioca top scorer: 1975 (30 goals), 1977 (27 goals), 1978 (19 goals), 1979 (26 goals), 1982 (21 goals)
 South American Footballer of the Year: 1977, 1981, 1982
 South American Footballer of the Year Silver Ball: 1976, 1980
 Brazilian season top scorer: 1976 (63 goals), 1977 (48 goals), 1979 (81 goals), 1980 (53 goals), 1982 (59 goals)
 FIFA XI: 1979, 1982
 Campeonato Brasileiro Série A top scorer: 1980 (21 goals), 1982 (21 goals)
 Guerin Sportivo All-Star Team: 1980, 1981, 1983
 Copa Libertadores Best Player: 1981
 Copa Libertadores top scorer: 1981
 Intercontinental Cup MVP Award: 1981
 Guerin Sportivo Player of the Year: 1981
 FIFA World Cup Bronze Boot: 1982
 FIFA World Cup All-Star Team: 1982
 World Soccer Player of the Year: 1983
 Chevron Award: 1984
 Serie A Player of the Year: 1984
 Beach Soccer World Championship Top Scorer: 1995 (12 goals)
 Beach Soccer World Championship Best Player: 1995
 FIFA Order of Merit: 1996
 FIFA 100: 2004
 Golden Foot Legends Award: 2006
 Brazilian Football Museum Hall of Fame: 2010
 IFFHS 3rd Best Brazilian Player of the 20th century
 IFFHS 7th Best South American Player of the 20th century
 IFFHS 14th Best Player of the 20th century
 FIFA 7th Best Player of the 20th century (FIFA Magazine and Grand Jury vote)
 France Football 9th Best Player of the 20th century
 World Soccer Magazine 18th Greatest Player of the 20th century
 Placar 16th Best Player of the 20th century
 IFFHS Legends

Records 
 Top scorer in Flamengo's history – 508 goals
 Top scorer in Maracanã Stadium – 333 goals
 Japan Soccer League record for goals scored in straight matches – 11 goals in 10 matches (1992)
 Flamengo record holder – Top scorer in a single season – 81 goals (1979)

Manager

Club 
Fenerbahçe
 Süper Lig: 2006–07
 Turkish Super Cup: 2007

Bunyodkor
 Uzbekistani Cup: 2008
 Uzbek League: 2008

CSKA Moscow
 Russian Super Cup: 2009
 Russian Cup: 2008–09

Olympiacos
 Super League Greece runners-up: 2009–10

FC Goa
 Indian Super League runners-up: 2015

International 
Japan
 Asian Cup: 2004

Statistics

International goals 

Scores and results; list Brazil's goal tally first.

See also 
 List of men's footballers with 500 or more goals
 List of athletes who came out of retirement

References

External links 

 
 
 
 
 rec.sports.soccer Statistics Foundation – "Zico" – Goals in International Matches
 
 Zico na rede: The Movie – Documentary
 
 
 Japan Football Hall of Fame at Japan Football Association
 

1953 births
Living people
FIFA 100
Brazilian footballers
Brazilian expatriate footballers
Brazil international footballers
Brazilian football chairmen and investors
Brazilian football managers
Brazilian bloggers
Brazilian sportsperson-politicians
1978 FIFA World Cup players
1979 Copa América players
1982 FIFA World Cup players
1986 FIFA World Cup players
Copa Libertadores-winning players
2003 FIFA Confederations Cup managers
2004 AFC Asian Cup managers
2005 FIFA Confederations Cup managers
2006 FIFA World Cup managers
AFC Asian Cup-winning managers
Campeonato Brasileiro Série A players
CR Flamengo footballers
Serie A players
Udinese Calcio players
Expatriate footballers in Italy
Japan Soccer League players
J1 League players
Kashima Antlers players
Expatriate footballers in Japan
Expatriate football managers in Japan
J1 League managers
Kashima Antlers managers
Japan national football team managers
Fenerbahçe football managers
PFC CSKA Moscow managers
Russian Premier League managers
Expatriate football managers in Russia
World Soccer Magazine World Player of the Year winners
Süper Lig managers
Expatriate football managers in Turkey
Olympiacos F.C. managers
Super League Greece managers
Indian Super League head coaches
Expatriate football managers in Greece
Expatriate football managers in Qatar
Footballers from Rio de Janeiro (city)
South American Footballer of the Year winners
Al-Gharafa SC managers
Expatriate football managers in India
Iraq national football team managers
Expatriate football managers in Iraq
Brazilian people of Portuguese descent
Brazilian beach soccer players
Association football midfielders
Expatriate football managers in Uzbekistan
FC Bunyodkor managers
Brazilian expatriate sportspeople in Italy
Brazilian expatriate sportspeople in Turkey
Brazilian expatriate sportspeople in Japan
Brazilian expatriate sportspeople in Russia
Brazilian expatriate sportspeople in Greece
Brazilian expatriate sportspeople in Qatar
Brazilian expatriate sportspeople in India
Brazilian expatriate sportspeople in Iraq
Brazilian expatriate sportspeople in Uzbekistan
Brazilian Roman Catholics
FC Goa managers
Centro de Futebol Zico managers